Christine Kinsey (born October 1942) is a Welsh painter, now based in Pembrokeshire. She was the Co-Founder and Artistic Director of Chapter Workshops and Centre of the Arts, Cardiff, now called the Chapter Arts Centre.

Biography
Kinsey was born in Pontypool, and has developed a group of female characters who emerge repeatedly in her paintings. These characters enact roles within the themes that she explores in her work including what it was like to grow up female in the industrial valleys of south east Wales; and Cymreictod (a sense of feeling, being Welsh). Her touring solo show, Cymreictod – Women of Wales (1989-91), was reviewed in the magazine Spare Rib. Kinsey also examines the depiction of women within a western Christian culture.

Words and poetry have always been an important influence in Kinsey’s work. In 2014, she curated the exhibition Correspondences – contemporary painting in response to the life and writing of R. S. Thomas at Plas Glyn-y-Weddw, Pwllheli. The exhibition included work by 14 contemporary artists based in Wales including Kinsey, Osi Rhys Osmond, Iwan Bala, Ivor Davies and Mary Lloyd Jones. The catalogue for the exhibition included poetry by Menna Elfyn and Myrddin ap Dafydd. Later the same year, the exhibition was amalgamated by the curator Lynne Crompton with work from artists responding to Dylan Thomas at Oriel Q Gallery in Narberth. At an event to mark R. S. Thomas’ centenary in 2013, Kinsey was invited by the event organisers, the University of Wales Press and Swansea University professor M Wynn Thomas (R. S. Thomas’ biographer and executor of his literary estate), to talk about the ways in which the poetry of R. S. Thomas has influenced her art.

Her work is represented in the Victoria and Albert Museum in London, the National Library of Wales in Aberystwyth, Glynn Vivian Art Gallery in Swansea, Contemporary Art Society of Wales in Cardiff and Newport Museum in Newport.

References

External links

 
 

1942 births
Living people
20th-century Welsh painters
21st-century Welsh painters
20th-century Welsh women artists
21st-century Welsh women artists
People from Pontypool
Welsh women painters